Carlemannia is a genus of flowering plants in the family Carlemanniaceae, found in Nepal, the eastern Himalaya, Assam, Tibet, south-central and southeast China, Indochina, and Sumatra. Basal in their lineage, which is now thought to be the Lamiales, they have a chromosome count of 2n=30.

Species
Currently accepted species include:

Carlemannia congesta Hook.f.
Carlemannia griffithii Benth.
Carlemannia tetragona Hook.f.

References

Lamiales genera
Lamiales